SSE may refer to:

Computing
Senior software engineer
Server-sent events, pushes content to web clients
Simple Sharing Extensions, extends RSS from unidirectional to bidirectional
Sizzle (selector engine),  JQuery feature, allowing CSS-like selection of DOM elements
SPARQL Syntax Expressions
SQL Server Express Edition, Microsoft software
Streaming SIMD Extensions, an instruction set extension with the Pentium III
Social Software Engineering,  social aspects of software development and the developed software
Searchable symmetric encryption

Economics and finance
Social and solidarity economy
Steady-state economy
Substantial shareholdings exemption, a United Kingdom tax relief relating to capital gains on shares
Supply-side economics
Sustainable Stock Exchanges Initiative, a United Nations initiative to promote a peer-to-peer-based learning platform for stock exchanges
Small-scale enterprise

Exchanges
Shanghai Shipping Exchange, see Shipping industry of China
Shanghai Stock Exchange
Somalia Stock Exchange

Entertainment
Shin Seiki Evangelion, an anime produced by Gainax Animation
Skyrim Special Edition, the remastered version of The Elder Scrolls V: Skyrim
Spaceship Earth (Epcot), an attraction and icon at Epcot, located in the Walt Disney World Resort
Sins of a Solar Empire, a video game created by Ironclad Games
Subspace Emissary, the main story of the game Super Smash Brothers Brawl
Three venues in the UK:
SSE Arena, Belfast
The SSE Arena, Wembley, London
SSE Hydro, Glasgow

Language
Scottish Standard English, or Standard Scottish English, a dialect of the English language
Standard Singapore English, a dialect of the English language
Sign Supported English, the use of British Sign Language with an English grammar

Organizations
SSE plc (formerly Scottish and Southern Energy), an energy company in the UK and Ireland
School for Social Entrepreneurs, a training institution in the UK; founded by Michael Young
School of Social Ecology, an academic unit of the University of California, Irvine
Seed Savers Exchange, a seedbank
Seven Seas Entertainment, a North American publisher of Japanese manga
Society for Scientific Exploration, in fringe science
Society for the Study of Evolution, in science, a professional organization of evolutionary biologists
Southern Star Endemol, an Australian television company
Stockholm School of Economics, one of Northern Europe's leading business schools
Stredoslovenská energetika, an energy company in Slovakia
Symbiosis School of Economics, an Economics college in India

Other
Sensitive site exploitation, a military term used to describe retrieving incriminating information from a location
Silk screen effect, a visual phenomenon seen in rear-projection televisions
Soapsuds enema, a synonym for a large volume enema, whether or not soap is used
South-southeast, a compass direction (one of the eight "half-winds")
Submerged signal ejector, a device used by submarines
Sum of squared estimate of errors, in statistics; see Residual sum of squares
Shoreham-by-Sea railway station, Sussex, England (station code: SSE)

See also
Shenzhen Stock Exchange (SZSE)